Cape Cleveland, also known as Innartalik, is a headland in Northwest Greenland, Avannaata municipality.

Geography
Cape Cleveland is located in the northern shore of Murchison Sound, north of Qeqertarsuaq (Herbert Island) near the entrance of Inglefield Gulf, Baffin Bay. It rises at the western end of Piulip Nunaa, on the eastern side of the mouth of MacCormick Fjord.

References

External links
 Greenland Pilot - Danish Geodata Agency

 Headlands of Greenland